University Church may refer to:
University Church of St Mary the Virgin, Oxford
University Church, Central Philippine University
Fordham University Church, New York City
Loma Linda University Church, California
Newman University Church, Dublin
Church of St. Mary the Virgin, commonly known as the University Church, Budapest
Church of the Jesuits, also known as the Church of the University, Valletta